Harry Verrier Holman Elwin (29 August 1902 – 22 February 1964) was a British-born Indian anthropologist, ethnologist and tribal activist, who began his career in India as a Christian missionary. He first abandoned the clergy, to work with Mahatma Gandhi and the Indian National Congress, then converted to Hinduism in 1935 after staying in a Gandhian ashram, and split with the nationalists over what he felt was an overhasty process of transformation and assimilation for the tribals. Verrier Elwin is best known for his early work with the Baigas and Gonds of Orissa and Madhya Pradesh in central India, and he married a 13 year old member of one of the communities he studied. He later also worked on the tribals of several North East Indian states especially North-East Frontier Agency (NEFA) and settled in Shillong, the hill capital of Meghalaya.

In time he became an authority on Indian tribal lifestyle and culture, particularly on the Gondi people. He served as the Deputy Director of the Anthropological Survey of India upon its formation in 1945. Post-independence, he took up Indian citizenship. Prime Minister Jawaharlal Nehru appointed him as an adviser on tribal affairs for north-eastern India, and later he was Anthropological Adviser to the Government of NEFA (now Arunachal Pradesh. His philosophy towards the north-east was partially responsible in its disconnect from the modern world.

The Government of India awarded him the third highest civilian honour of the Padma Bhushan in 1961. His autobiography, The Tribal World of Verrier Elwin won him the 1965 Sahitya Akademi Award in English Language, given by the Sahitya Akademi, India's National Academy of Letters.

Early life and education
Harry Verrier Holman Elwin was born on 29 August 1902 in Dover. He is the son of Edmund Henry Elwin, Bishop of Sierra Leone. He was educated at Dean Close School and Merton College, Oxford, where he received his degrees of BA First Class in English Language and Literature, MA, and DSc. He also remained the President of Oxford Inter-Collegiate Christian Union (OICCU) in 1925. He had a nice career at Oxford, where he took a Double First in English and in Theology, before being ordained a priest in the Church of England. He came to India in 1927, to join a small sect, the Christa Seva Sangh of Poona, which hoped to 'indigenise' Christianity.

Career
In 1926, he was appointed Vice-Principal of Wycliffe Hall, Oxford and in the following year he became a lecturer at Merton College, Oxford. He went to India in 1927 as a missionary. Over the years, he was influenced by the philosophies of Mahatma Gandhi and Rabindranath Tagore. He quickly threw in his lot with the Congress, winning Gandhi's affection and becoming a camp follower and occasional cheerleader to the popular movement against British rule. Seeking fuller immersion in the toil, the sufferings, the poverty of India, he resolved to make his home among the Gonds. He first joined Christian Service Society in Pune. The first time he visited the central India, now the states of Madhya Pradesh, Chhattisgarh, and parts of eastern Maharashtra, was with an Indian from Pune, Shamrao Hivale. For the first time, he visited a remote village in the forests of  Mandla district. Hivale and he were to spend some twenty years in Central India, living with and fighting for tribal rights. Their studies on the tribes are some of the earliest anthropological studies in the country. In January 1954, Elwin became the first foreigner to be accepted as an Indian citizen. In the same year, he was appointed anthropological adviser to the Indian Government, with the special reference to the hill tribes of the north east. Moving to Shillong, he served for a decade as a leading missionary of what he liked to call 'Mr Nehru's Gospel for tribes'. He died in 1964, a greatly esteemed public figure in his adopted land, the recipient of the Padma Bhushan and countless other medals and rewards. He participated in the Indian independence movement, and in 1930 Gandhi said he regarded Elwin as a son.

He came out with numerous works on various tribal groups in India, the best acclaimed being those on Maria and Baigas.

After India attained independence in 1947, he was asked by Nehru to find solutions to the problems that emerged among the tribal peoples living in the far northeastern corner of India, the North East Frontier Agency (NEFA). He was also a Fellow of the Indian National Science Academy. Elwin entered into an agreement which prohibited the entry of Sadhus into Nagaland with Nehru.

The historian Ramachandra Guha's biography Savaging the Civilized: Verrier Elwin, His Tribals, and India (1999) brought renewed attention in India to Elwin's life and career.

On Ghotul
Verrier Elwin wrote – "The message of the ghotul – that youth must be served, that freedom and happiness are more to be treasured than any material gain, that friendliness and sympathy, hospitality and unity are of the first importance, and above all that human love – and its physical expression – is beautiful, clean and precious, is typically Indian."

Personal life
Elwin married a Raj Gond tribal girl called Kosi who was a student at his school at Raythwar (Raithwar) in Dindori district in Madhya Pradesh on 4 April 1940. They had one son, Jawaharlal (Kumar), born in 1941. Elwin had an ex-parte divorce in 1949, at the Calcutta High Court, writing in his autobiography, "I cannot even now look back on this period of my life without a deep sense of pain and failure"  In 2006, Kosi was still living in a hut in Raythwar, their son Kumar having died. Kosi's second son, Vijay, also died young. Elwin remarried a woman called Lila, belonging to the Pardhan Gond tribe in nearby Patangarh, moving with her to Shillong in the early 1950s. They had three sons, Wasant, Nakul and Ashok. Elwin died in Delhi on 22 February 1964 after a heart attack. His widow Lila died in Mumbai in 2013, aged about 80, shortly after the demise of their eldest son, Wasant. His marriage to Lila connected Verrier to Jangarh Singh Shyam, the Gond artist.

Works
 Christian Dhyana. Society for Promoting Christian Knowledge, 1930.
 The Dawn of Indian Freedom, with Jack Copley Winslow. G. Allen & Unwin, 1931.
 Gandhi: the Dawn of Indian Freedom, with John Copley Winslow. Fleming H. Revell company, 1934..
 Truth about India: can we get it?. G. Allen & Unwin, 1932.
 Mahatma Gandhi: sketches in pen, pencil and brush, with Kanu Desai. Golden Vista Press, 1932.
 Songs of the Forest: the folk poetry of the Gonds. with Shamrao Hivale. London: G. Allen & Unwin, 1935.
 Leaves from the Jungle: Life in a Gond Village. John Murray Publishers Ltd, 1936.
 The Agaria. H. Milford, Oxford University Press, 1942.
 The Aboriginals. H. Milford, Oxford University Press, 1944.
 Folk-songs of the Maikal Hills. with Shamrao Hivale. H. Milford, Oxford University Press, 1944.
 Folk-songs of Chhattisgarh. G. Cumberlege, Oxford University Press, 1946.
 The Muria and their Ghotul. Oxford University Press, 1947.
 Myths of Middle India, Indian Branch, Oxford University Press, 1949.
 Bondo Highlander. Oxford University Press, 1950.
 Maria Murder and Suicide, Oxford University Press, 1950.
 The Tribal Art of Middle India: a personal record. Indian Branch, Oxford University Press, 1951.
 Tribal Myths of Orissa. Indian Branch, Oxford University Press, 1954.
 The Religion of an Indian Tribe. Oxford University Press, 1955.
 Myths of the North-east Frontier of India, Volume 1. North-East Frontier Agency, 1958.
 India's North-east Frontier in the Nineteenth Century. Oxford University Press, 1959.
 The Art of the North-east Frontier of India, Volume 1. Pub. North-East Frontier Agency, 1959.
 The Fisher-Girl and the Crab
 A Philosophy for NEFA.  S. Roy on behalf of the North-East Frontier Agency (NEFA), 1960.
 A New Deal for Tribal India. Abridgement of the tenth Report of the Commissioner for Scheduled Castes and Scheduled Tribes for the year 1960–61. Ministry of Home Affairs, 1963.
 When the World was Young: folk-tales from India's hills and forests. Publication Div., Ministry of Information & Broadcasting, Govt. of India, 1961.
 The Tribal World of Verrier Elwin: An Autobiography. Oxford University Press, 1964.
 Religious and Cultural Aspects of Khadi. Sarvodaya Prachuralaya, 1964.
 Democracy in NEFA.. North-East Frontier Agency, 1965.
 Folk Paintings of India. Inter-national Cultural Centre, 1967.
 The Kingdom of the Young, Oxford University Press, 1968.
 The Nagas in the Nineteenth Century. Oxford University Press, 1969.
 A New Book of Tribal Fiction. North-East Frontier Agency, 1970.
 Folk-tales of Mahakoshal. Arno Press, 1980.
 The Baiga. Gian Pub. House, 1986.
 Verrier Elwin, Philanthropologist: Selected Writings,  Ed. Nari Rustomji. North-Eastern Hill Univ. Publications; Oxford University Press, 2002, .

Further reading

 Scholar gypsy: A study of Verrier Elwin, Shamrao Hivale. N.M. Tripathi, 1946.
 Anthropology and archaeology: essays in commemoration of Verrier Elwin, 1902–64. Ed. Mahesh Chandra Pradhan. Oxford University Press, 1969.
 An evaluative study of Verrier Elwin, folklorist, by Bhabagrahi Misra. Indiana University, 1969.
 Verrier Elwin: a pioneer Indian anthropologist. Asia Pub. House, 1973. .
 Verrier Elwin and India's north-eastern borderlands, by Nari Rustomji. North-Eastern Hill University Publications, 1988.
 Din-sevak: Verrier Elwin's life of service in tribal India. Daniel O'Connor, Christian Institute for the Study of Religion & Society, Bangalore, 1993. .
 Savaging the Civilized — Verrier Elwin, his tribals and India, Ramchandra Guha. University of Chicago Press; OUP. 1999.
 Against ecological romanticism: Verrier Elwin and the making of an anti-modern tribal identity, by Archana Prasad. Three Essays Collective, 2003.
 Verrier Elwin as remembered by his family and friends, by B. Francis Kulirani, Bibhash Dhar. Anthropological Survey of India, 2003. .
Between Ethnography and Fiction: Verrier Elwin and the Tribal Question in India.  Tanka Bahadur Subba, Sujit Som, K. C. Baral (eds.). New Delhi: Orient Longman, 2005. .
 
 Rousseleau, Raphaël (2019). « Verrier Elwin, du missionnaire gandhien à l’ethnopoète philanthropologue (1928-1939) », in Gaetano Ciarcia & André Mary (ed.), Ethnologie en situation missionnaire, Les Carnets de Bérose n° 12, Paris, BEROSE - International Encyclopaedia of the Histories of Anthropology, pp. 250–278.

See also
Christoph von Fürer-Haimendorf

References

External links and further sources

 The Muria and Their Ghotul by Verrier Elwin
 Warren E. Roberts, 'Verrier Elwin (1902–1964)', Asian Folklore Studies 23:2 (1964), 212–14
 The Tribal World of Verrier Elwin, An Autobiography, Oxford University Press (1964)
 Beating a dead horse Verrier Elwin
Resources related to research : BEROSE - International Encyclopaedia of the Histories of Anthropology. "Elwin, Verrier (1902-1964)", Paris, 2019. (ISSN 2648-2770)

1902 births
1964 deaths
People from Shillong
Protestant missionaries in India
Converts to Hinduism from Christianity
Alumni of Merton College, Oxford
British ethnologists
People educated at Dean Close School
Fellows of Wycliffe Hall, Oxford
Naturalised citizens of India
Indian people of English descent
British emigrants to India
British Hindus
British anthropologists
Indian anthropologists
Indian male novelists
Recipients of the Sahitya Akademi Award in English
Indigenous rights activists
People from Dover, Kent
Indian folklorists
Indian Hindus
Recipients of the Padma Bhushan in science & engineering
English Protestant missionaries
20th-century anthropologists
People associated with Shillong